Asnaq is a village in Ardalan Rural District, Mehraban District, Sarab County, East Azerbaijan Province, Iran. At the 2006 census, its population was 725, in 175 families.

References 

Populated places in Sarab County